Saint-Denis-d'Oléron (literally Saint-Denis of Oléron) is a commune on Oléron Island, located in the French department of Charente-Maritime, administrative region of Nouvelle-Aquitaine (before 2015: Poitou-Charentes).

Geography 

The town of Saint-Denis d'Oléron is located at the northern end of the Île d'Oléron, in the northwest of the Charente-Maritime department.

Activities 

St. Denis-d'Oléron is the northernmost town of the island. As a result, the town has managed to retain an environment in which nature, authenticity and recreation are in perfect harmony.

Among the local activities are: swimming for families on Boirie beach (which is lined with multicolored cabins), sports on the beach, bike trails along the coastline, walks on the marina (with assured access to local gastronomy), sea fishing and boat trips (daily).

The majestic Chassiron lighthouse is near the town, overlooking the Passage of Antioch, with unforgettable views from its summit at 46 meters.

Population

See also
Communes of the Charente-Maritime department

References

Communes of Charente-Maritime
Oléron
Charente-Maritime communes articles needing translation from French Wikipedia
Populated coastal places in France